Savandapur Muthu Gounder Palaniappan (born 1930), better known as S. M. Palaniappan,  is a former Member of the Legislative Assembly of Tamil Nadu. He was elected to the Tamil Nadu legislative assembly as a Dravida Munnetra Kazhagam candidate from Gobichettipalayam constituency in 1971. He served under two different Chief Ministers Annadurai and Karunanidhi.

Personal life
Palaniappan was born in 1930 as the eldest son of Muthu Gounder in Savandapur village, Gobichettipalayam. He hailed from a family with predominant agricultural background and lost his mother at an early age. He worked hard to become a doctor by profession. He has a younger brother, S .M. Kandappan, a lawyer by profession and three other sisters. He does great service to the community through his profession and he continues to serve people even after 80 years of age with no/minimum fee.

References

Dravida Munnetra Kazhagam politicians
Living people
1930 births